Phil Nugent (born Philip Harper Nugent) was a former professional American football defensive back. He played for the Denver Broncos of the American Football League during the 1961 AFL season.

Nugent played quarterback at Tulane.
He died on November 26, 2019.

References

Sportspeople from Lafayette, Louisiana
Players of American football from Louisiana
Denver Broncos (AFL) players
American football defensive backs
Tulane Green Wave football players
1939 births
2019 deaths